Ust'-Ishim man is the term given to the 45,000-year-old remains of one of the early modern humans to inhabit western Siberia. The fossil is notable in that it had intact DNA which permitted the complete sequencing of its genome, one of the oldest modern human genomes to be so decoded.

The remains consist of a single bone—left femur—of a male hunter-gatherer, which was discovered in 2008 protruding from the bank of the Irtysh River by Nikolai Peristov, a Russian sculptor who specialises in carving mammoth ivory. Peristov showed the fossil to a forensic investigator who suggested that it might be of human origin. The fossil was named after the Ust'-Ishim District of Siberia where it had been discovered.

Genome sequencing
The fossil was examined by paleoanthropologists in the Max Planck Institute for Evolutionary Anthropology, located in Leipzig, Germany. Carbon dating showed that the fossil dates back to 45,000 years ago, making it the oldest human fossil to be so dated. Scientists found the DNA intact and were able to sequence the complete genome of Ust'-Ishim man to contemporary standards of quality.

Y-DNA and mtDNA
Ust'-Ishim man belongs to Y-DNA haplogroup K2. The two subclades of K2 are K2a and K2b In the original paper, he was classified only as Haplogroup K-M9 (KxLT).

He belonged to mitochondrial DNA haplogroup R*, differing from the root sequence of R by a single mutation.

Both of these haplogroups and descendant subclades are now found among populations throughout Eurasia, Oceania and The Americas, although no direct descendants of Ust Ishim man's specific lineages are known from modern populations.

Examination of the sequenced genome indicates that Ust'-Ishim man lived at a point in time (270,000 to 45,000 years ago) between the first wave of anatomically modern humans that migrated out of Africa and the divergence of that population into distinct populations, in terms of autosomal DNA in different parts of Eurasia. Consequently, Ust'-Ishim man is not more closely related to the first two major migrations of Homo Sapiens eastward from Africa into Asia: a group that migrated along the coast of South Asia, or a group that moved north-east through Central Asia. When compared to other ancient remains, Ust'-Ishim man is more closely related, in terms of autosomal DNA to Tianyuan man, found near Beijing and dating from 42,000 to 39,000 years ago; Mal'ta boy (or MA-1), a child who lived 24,000 years ago along the Bolshaya Belaya River near today's Irkutsk in Siberia, or; La Braña man – a hunter-gatherer who lived in La Braña (modern Spain) about 8,000 years ago.

Relationship with Neanderthals
Analysis of modern human genomes reveals that humans interbred with Neanderthals between 37,000 and 86,000 years ago, resulting in the DNA of humans outside Africa containing between 1.5 and 2.1 percent DNA of Neanderthal origin. Neanderthal DNA in modern humans occurs in broken fragments; however, the Neanderthal DNA in Ust'-Ishim man occurs in clusters, indicating that Ust'-Ishim man lived in the immediate aftermath of the genetic interchange. The genomic sequencing of Ust'-Ishim man has led to refinement of the estimated date of mating between the two hominin species to between 52,000 and 58,000 years ago.

No relationship between Denisovans and the Ust'-Ishim man has been checked, although Denisovans have some descendants in Oceania and Asia.

Relationship with modern human populations
Ust'-Ishim was equally related to modern East Asians, Oceanians and West Eurasian populations, such as the ancient Europeans. Modern Europeans are more closely related to other ancient remains. "The finding that the Ust’-Ishim individual is equally closely related to present-day Asians and to 8,000- to 24,000-year-old individuals from western Eurasia, but not to present-day Europeans, is compatible with the hypothesis that present-day Europeans derive some of their ancestry from a population that did not participate in the initial dispersals of modern humans into Europe and Asia."

In a 2016 study, modern Tibetans were identified as the modern population that has the most alleles in common with Ust'-Ishim man. According to a 2017 study, "Siberian and East Asian populations shared 38% of their ancestry" with Ust’-Ishim man. A 2021 study found that "the Ust’Ishim and Oase1 individuals showed no more affinity to western than to eastern Eurasian populations, suggesting that they did not contribute ancestry to later Eurasian populations, as previously shown.

References

Upper Paleolithic Homo sapiens fossils
People from Siberia
Omsk Oblast
2008 in Russia
2008 archaeological discoveries
Fossils of Russia
Archaeological sites in Siberia